Ethmia howdeni is a moth in the family Depressariidae. It is native to Mexico and Central America.

The ground color of the forewings is off-white, irregularly and indistinctly blotched with pale gray to almost entirely pale grayish. The ground color of the hindwings is semitranslucent off-white basally, becoming pale brownish in the apical area and along the hind margin.

References

Moths described in 1973
howdeni